In organic chemistry, an oxime is a organic compound belonging to the imines, with the general formula , where R is an organic side-chain and R' may be hydrogen, forming an aldoxime, or another organic group, forming a ketoxime. O-substituted oximes form a closely related family of compounds. Amidoximes are oximes of amides with general structure .

Oximes are usually generated by the reaction of hydroxylamine with aldehydes or ketones. The term oxime dates back to the 19th century, a combination of the words oxygen and imine.

Structure and properties
If the two side-chains on the central carbon are different from each other—either an aldoxime, or a ketoxime with two different "R" groups—the oxime can often have two different geometric stereoisomeric forms according to the E/Z configuration. An older terminology of syn and anti was used to identify especially aldoximes according to whether the R group was closer or further from the hydroxyl.  Both forms are often stable enough to be separated from each other by standard techniques.

Oximes have three characteristic bands in the infrared spectrum, whose wavelengths corresponding to the stretching vibrations of its three types of bonds: 3600 cm−1 (O−H), 1665 cm−1 (C=N) and 945 cm−1 (N−O).

In aqueous solution, aliphatic oximes are 102- to 103-fold more resistant to hydrolysis than analogous hydrazones.

Preparation
Oximes can be synthesized by condensation of an aldehyde or a ketone with hydroxylamine. The condensation of aldehydes with hydroxylamine gives aldoximes, and ketoximes are produced from ketones and hydroxylamine. In general, oximes exist as colorless crystals or as thick liquids and are poorly soluble in water. Therefore, oxime formation can be used for the identification of ketone or aldehyde functional groups.

Oximes can also be obtained from reaction of nitrites such as isoamyl nitrite with compounds containing an acidic hydrogen atom. Examples are the reaction of ethyl acetoacetate and sodium nitrite in acetic acid, the reaction of methyl ethyl ketone with ethyl nitrite in hydrochloric acid. and a similar reaction with propiophenone, the reaction of phenacyl chloride, the reaction of malononitrile with sodium nitrite in acetic acid

A conceptually related reaction is the Japp–Klingemann reaction.

Reactions
The hydrolysis of oximes proceeds easily by heating in the presence of various inorganic acids, and the oximes decompose into the corresponding ketones or aldehydes, and hydroxylamines. The reduction of oximes by sodium metal, sodium amalgam, hydrogenation, or reaction with hydride reagents produces amines. Typically the reduction of aldoximes gives both primary amines and secondary amines; however, reaction conditions can be altered (such as the addition of potassium hydroxide in a 1/30 molar ratio) to yield solely primary amines.
 
In general, oximes can be changed to the corresponding amide derivatives by treatment with various acids. This reaction is called Beckmann rearrangement. In this reaction, a hydroxyl group is exchanged with the group that is in the anti position of the hydroxyl group. The amide derivatives that are obtained by Beckmann rearrangement can be transformed into a carboxylic acid by means of hydrolysis (base or acid catalyzed). And an amine by Hoffman degradation of the amide in the presence of alkali hypoclorites. Beckmann rearrangement is used for the industrial synthesis of caprolactam (see applications below).

The Ponzio reaction (1906) concerning the conversion of m-nitrobenzaldoxime to m-nitrophenyldinitromethane using dinitrogen tetroxide was the result of research into TNT analogues:

In the Neber rearrangement certain oximes are converted to the corresponding alpha-amino ketones.

Oximes can be dehydrated using acid anhydrides to yield corresponding nitriles.

Certain amidoximes react with benzenesulfonyl chloride to make substituted ureas in the Tiemann rearrangement:

Uses
In their largest application, an oxime is an intermediate in the industrial production of caprolactam, a precursor to Nylon 6. About half of the world's supply of cyclohexanone, more than a million tonnes annually, is converted to the oxime. In the presence of sulfuric acid catalyst, the oxime undergoes the Beckmann rearrangement to give the cyclic amide caprolactam:

Metal extractant

Oximes are commonly used as ligands and sequestering agents for metal ions. Dimethylglyoxime (dmgH2) is a reagent for the analysis of nickel and a popular ligand in its own right. In the typical reaction, a metal reacts with two equivalents of dmgH2 concomitant with ionization of one proton. Salicylaldoxime is a chelator in hydrometallurgy.

Amidoximes such as polyacrylamidoxime can be used to capture trace amounts of uranium from sea water. In 2017 researchers announced a configuration that absorbed up to nine times as much uranyl as previous fibers without saturating.

Other applications
 Oxime compounds are used as antidotes for nerve agents. A nerve agent inactivates acetylcholinesterase by phosphorylation. Oxime compounds can reactivate acetylcholinesterase by attaching to phosphorus, forming an oxime-phosphonate, which then splits away from the acetylcholinesterase molecule. Oxime nerve-agent antidotes are pralidoxime (also known as 2-PAM), obidoxime, methoxime, HI-6, Hlo-7, and TMB-4. The effectiveness of the oxime treatment depends on the particular nerve agent used.
 Perillartine, the oxime of perillaldehyde, is used as an artificial sweetener in Japan.  It is 2000 times sweeter than sucrose.
 Diaminoglyoxime is a key precursor to various compounds containing the highly reactive furazan ring.
 Methyl ethyl ketoxime is a skin-preventing additive in many oil-based paints.
 Buccoxime and 5-methyl-3-heptanone oxime ("Stemone") are perfume ingredients.
Fluvoxamine is used as an antidepressant.

See also
 :Category:Oximes – specific chemicals containing this functional group
 Nitrone – the N-oxide of an imine

References

Functional groups
Organic compounds
 
Chelating agents